"Teach Me" is a song by Dutch producer Bakermat. It was released on 24 November 2014 by the Dirty Soul Music division of Be Yourself Music as the first single of his upcoming debut album, which was to be released in early 2015.

The song consists of samples of American gospel singer Shirley Caesar's song "Teach Me Master", which originally appeared on her 1972 album Get Up My Brother.

Charts

References 

2014 singles
2014 songs